Explicit Ills is a 2008 American film, written and directed by Mark Webber in his directorial debut. The film features four interconnected stories taking place in Philadelphia involving subject matter such as poverty, drugs, and the possibility of love.

The film the Audience Award for Narrative Feature and the Special Jury Award for Cinematography at the SXSW Film Festival.

Cast 
 Francisco Burgos as Babo
 Paul Dano as Rocco
 Rosario Dawson as Babo's Mother
 Naomie Harris as Jill
 Lou Taylor Pucci as Jacob
 Frankie Shaw as Michelle
 Tariq Trotter as Kaleef
 Martin Cepeda as Demetri
 Cheri Honkala as March organizer
 Tim Dowlin as March Organizer

References

External links 
 
 
 
 

2008 films
2008 drama films
American drama films
2000s English-language films
Films directed by Mark Webber
2008 directorial debut films
2000s American films